

List of Desna 3 Chernihiv players

Notable players
 Dmytro Sydorenko
 Viktor Rudyi
 Bohdan Lytvynenko
 Maksym Shumylo
 Pavlo Shostka
 Igor Samoylenko
 Danyil Pus
 Renat Mochulyak
 Georgios Ermidis
 Artem Khatskevich
 Sergey Korshun 
 Sergey Makarenko
 Oleksandr Pyshchur
 Vladyslav Yefymenko
 Artur Havrylenko
 Denys Kharchenko
 Denys Khapilin
 Mykola Pykhtar
 Sergey Makarenko
 Dmytro Zapeka
 Vladyslav Panko
 Vladyslav Shkolnyi
 Yehor Kolomiets
 Bogdan Bozhok
 Rasim Khasanov

References

players